"Crooked Teeth" is a song by indie rock band Death Cab for Cutie, the second single from their fifth album, Plans, released on April 11, 2006.

The single was released on Atlantic Records, featuring the song "Crooked Teeth" and two B-side tracks: "Talking Like Turnstiles", and a cover of the Julian Cope song "World Shut Your Mouth", which was originally released two years earlier as a B-side on the internet-only single "Title and Registration", from the band's previous album, Transatlanticism. The single peaked at number 10 on the U.S. Billboard Hot Modern Rock Tracks chart, making it Death Cab for Cutie's seventh highest charting song in the United States to-date.

Background
The song was co-written by lead singer and guitarist Ben Gibbard, and guitarist Chris Walla. In a 2011 episode of VH1 Storytellers, Gibbard spoke about the back story behind the lyrical content of "Crooked Teeth":

Track listing

UK 7" single #1
 "Crooked Teeth"
 "World Shut Your Mouth"

UK 7" single #2
 "Crooked Teeth"
 "Talking Like Turnstiles"

UK CD Single
 "Crooked Teeth"
 "Talking Like Turnstiles"
 "Crooked Teeth" (Music Video)
 "Making of Plans" (Documentary Video)

Chart positions

Certifications

References

2006 singles
Death Cab for Cutie songs
2005 songs
Atlantic Records singles
Songs written by Ben Gibbard
Songs written by Chris Walla